Events from the year 1696 in the Kingdom of Scotland.

Incumbents 
 Monarch – William II
 Secretary of State – James Johnston, until January or February; then John Murray, Earl of Tullibardine (from 15 January) jointly with James Ogilvy, 4th Earl of Findlater (from 5 February)

Law officers 
 Lord Advocate – Sir James Stewart
 Solicitor General for Scotland – Sir Patrick Hume

Judiciary 
 Lord President of the Court of Session – vacant??
 Lord Justice General – Lord Lothian
 Lord Justice Clerk – Lord Ormiston

Events 
 February – the Bank of Scotland opens for business
 8 September – Education Act passed by parliament to establish schools in every parish in the country.
 Perth Academy founded.
 Famine in the Borders leads to a new wave of Scottish Presbyterian migration from Scotland to Ulster.

Births 
 11 June – James Francis Edward Keith, soldier and Prussian field marshal (died 1758)
 15 September – Sir Archibald Grant, 2nd Baronet, company speculator and Member of parliament for Aberdeenshire, 1722–1732  (died 1772)
 date unknown –
 William Duff, 1st Earl Fife, peer (died 1763)
 Henry Home, Lord Kames, advocate, judge, philosopher, writer and agricultural improver (died 1782)
 John Lyon, 5th Earl of Strathmore and Kinghorne, peer, died at the Battle of Sheriffmuir in 1715
 Anne O'Brien, 2nd Countess of Orkney, noblewoman, (died 1756)

Deaths 
 2 August – Robert Campbell of Glenlyon, a commanding officer at the Massacre of Glencoe (born 1630)
 date unknown – Arthur Forbes, 1st Earl of Granard, soldier (born 1623)

See also 
 Timeline of Scottish history

References 

 
Years of the 17th century in Scotland
1690s in Scotland